Bravanese may refer to:
the Bravanese people
the Bravanese dialect